Connecticut's 60th House of Representatives district elects one member of the Connecticut House of Representatives. It consists of the town of Windsor Locks and part of Windsor and has been represented by Democrat Jane Garibay since 2017.

Recent elections

2020

2018

2016

2014

2012

References

60